Cape Farewell may refer to:

 Cape Farewell, New Zealand, northernmost point of the South Island
 Cape Farewell, Greenland, southernmost point in the territory of Greenland
 Cape Farewell, UK, British arts organisation founded in 2002 to explore climate change through the cultural sector